Sepp Schönmetzler (born 24 September 1944 in Etzdorf, Saxony) is a German figure skater, coach, and journalist. He is the 1962 and 1965 German national champion and placed 12th at the 1964 Winter Olympics. He produces the German figure skating magazine Eissport-Magazin.

Biography

Personal life 

In 1963, Sepp Schönmetzler finished school and passed his Abitur in Oberstdorf.

In 1965, he was honored with honorary citizenship of Colorado Springs, Colorado, United States.

Beginning in 1967, he studied photography at the Staatlichen Höheren Fachschule, in Cologne. He  passed his degree in 1970 and became a Diplom-Engineer for technical-scientific photography.  In 1976, he studied  science of sport at the sport-college in Cologne (DSHS).  He finished these studies in 1979 as a Diplom-sport-teacher.

In 1984 he did his PhD at the DSHS in sports-science in the fields biomechanics and general coaching and moving science (Bewegungslehre).

In 1979, Sepp Schönmetzler married Sabine Beier. The couple had two children. They divorced on 31 January 2002.

Competitive career 

Sepp Schönmetzler began skating at age four. He represented the club SC Rießersee in national competition and was coached by his father, Josef Schönmetzler, a Diplom Sport-Teacher. His mother, Sonja Schönmetzler (nee Fuchs) was a sportswomen.

In addition to figure skating, Schönmetzler also competed in golf, tennis and shaolin temple boxing.

He won the German Figure Skating Championships in 1962 and 1965. He represented the United Team of Germany at the 1964 Winter Olympics, where he placed 12th. He also competed at the World Figure Skating Championships, with a highest placement of 7th, which he achieved in 1963, and at the European Figure Skating Championships, with a highest placement of 4th, which he achieved in 1965.

He retired from competitive skating in 1965. He turned professional and toured for two years with the Ice Capades.

Professional career 

Beginning in 1967, he worked also as a coach for the Cologne Iceclub (Kölner Eisklub). In 1970 he became certified coach for figure skating (Fachübungsleiter). In 1972, he started to work for the German newspaper BILD as a photo-journalist for three months in Cologne and later in Hamburg. In 1972 he worked voluntarily for the 1972 Summer Olympics  in Munich. He took part in producing the village newspaper (Dorfzeitung).

In 1977 he became a certified coach for tennis. From 1979 to 1991, he worked for the DSHS as scientific employee. Also from 1979 on Sepp Schönmetzler worked as a coach-teacher for the German sport association Deutscher Sportbund, LSB, the coaching academy in Cologne, for the German figure skation association DEU and its association in the state of North Rhine-Westphalia and others.

In 1983,  Schönmetzler became  the leading coach of the ice sport department of the club TSV Bayer 04  and worked there for three years. In 1986, Sepp Schönmetzler became the federal coach of Austria for figure skating and served in that position for  one year. In 1988, he became the leading coach at the club TUS Wiehl 1891.

Since 1992 Sepp Schönmetzler works as a freelance coach and sport event manager. He founded the publishing house for scientific sport information (Verlag für Sportfachinformation) and publishes the German ice sport magazine "Eissport-Magazin”.

Competitive results

References 

 Sports-reference profile in addition to the weblink are ISU statistics, DEU statistics and personnel interviews

External links 
 Sepp Schönmetzlers Homepage and Homepage of the Eissport-Magazin

1944 births
Living people
People from Mittelsachsen
German male single skaters
Figure skaters at the 1964 Winter Olympics
Olympic figure skaters of the United Team of Germany
Sportspeople from Saxony